Narcissus Luttrell (1657–1732) was an English historian, diarist, and bibliographer, and briefly Member of Parliament for two different Cornish boroughs. His Brief Historical Relation of State Affairs from September 1678 to April 1714, a chronicle of the Parliaments of England and Great Britain, was distilled from his diary and published in 1857, after Macaulay had drawn attention to the manuscript in All Souls College, Oxford.

Although Luttrell was for most of his life a private citizen and relied primarily on secondary sources for the workings of Parliament, he is often the best source available for legal and political matters of the time. The legislation itself is covered by the official parliamentary journals, but Luttrell's diary is often the only record of debates within the Palace of Westminster.  As a result, Luttrell provides crucial political information which cannot be found elsewhere; as one example out of many, he notes that the debate on taxation of 1691 was divided according to geography, with Norfolk and Suffolk arguing against the remainder of the country over methods of taxation. Since individual members' votes were not recorded, the political significance of the legislation would be less clear without Luttrell's record.

Luttrell's diary also covers major events in diplomacy, literature and the arts, as well as parliamentary proceedings, and is supplemented in those areas by annotations within his massive library. He also compiled a bibliography of texts relating to the Popish Plot, The Compleat Catalogue of Stitch’d Books and Single Sheets, &c. Luttrell had one of the most impressive book collections of his time, and it was his wish that the library would be preserved intact, perhaps in an institution such as Gray's Inn (where he was called to the bar in 1680). After the death in 1749 of Luttrell's only surviving son, Francis, the library passed to Luttrell's sister, Dorothy Wynne. Her grandson, Luttrell Wynne, a fellow of All Souls College Oxford, gave Luttrell's MSS to the Codrington Library at All Souls College, but other material was dispersed through sales. 

On January 21 1694, the future Queen Anne lost another child to stillbirth. Although she had a surviving son named William, she had suffered two stillbirths, three miscarriages, and lost 4 babies within hours, minutes, months, or years after they were born. Some sources say this child was a girl, who was 6 months gestation. Luttrell wrote that Anne “miscarried of a dead child.” He did not specify a gender. Anne would fall pregnant 6 more times, but they would end in miscarriage or stillbirth. Her son William died in 1700 at the age of 11 from an unknown illness.

While many pieces from Luttrell's collection were eventually acquired by the British Library, many were not. Material purchased by Professor James Osborn from two sales at Sotheby's (in 1936 and 1957) was later given to Beinecke Library at Yale University. Various portions of the collection are now housed in several libraries in Britain and the United States, notably the British Library, Beinecke Library, Newberry Library and Huntington Library. The whereabouts of other material remains unknown.

Major published works
 
 The Compleat Catalogue of Stitch’d Books and Single Sheets, &c. Printed Since the First Discovery of the Popish Plot (London, 1680).
 The Parliamentary Diary of Narcissus Luttrell, 1691–1693; ed. Henry Horwitz (Oxford: Clarendon Press, 1972).
 Narcissus Luttrell's Popish Plot Catalogues (Oxford: Blackwell for the Luttrell Society, 1956).

References

Further reading
 Horwitz, H. (2008). "Luttrell, Narcissus (1657–1732)". Oxford Dictionary of National Biography.  Oxford University Press, 2004; online edition, Jan 2008. DOI
 Osborn, J. (1957). "Reflections on Narcissus Lutrell, 1657–1732". The Book Collector 6 pp. 15–23.
 Parks, S., and Havens, E. eds. (1999). "The Luttrell file: Narcissus Luttrell's dates on contemporary pamphlets, 1678–1730", Yale University Library Gazette: Occasional Supplement 3. [whole issue]

1657 births
1732 deaths
English diarists
English bibliographers
18th-century English historians
British Library
English MPs 1679
English MPs 1680–1681
English MPs 1690–1695
Members of the Parliament of England for Bossiney
Members of the Parliament of England for Saltash